Meesdorf (Germany) is an urban district of Buer at the city of Melle in Osnabrück, Lower Saxony. It is located landwards at the Wiehen hills in Hunte valley and was historically known as "Metdisdorphe".

Locale 

In the northern part of Hunte Valley, dinosaur tracks were discovered. The erected building is rainproof. Around Barkhausen are signs to museums/exhibitions. At Hunte Valley, explorers also find many ways that lead into the Wiehenhills.

The "Rote Pfahl" is a marker at the side of the Kalbsiekstrasse-road, where 19th century trader's route through Meesdorf  is recorded. To move loaded wagons over the Bad Essen hill, traders had to use additional horses. The marker was used to signal to the traders the availability of a safe parking space. It represented, for other purposes a rallypoint, in case something uncommon ever happened (crimes, accidents, robberies, meetings, etc.).

The 13 ton boulderflint at the Glockenstraße-crossroads shall remind visitors of the long history of Meesdorf.

Etymological the village Meisdorf can be compared and is historically prooven to have developed from with "Meyerstorp".

Associations 
 Oldtimermachines Melle-Buer 
 Soccersports GreenWhite Meesdorf
 Rabbitclub Melle-Buer

Festivities 
 Yearly sportsfestival on soccersplace
 Yearly Easter Fire at tentsplace
 Hunters Meeting with venisonmeal
 Yearly Saint Nicholas meeting

Economic activity 
The raw land is mostly used for conventional and in small portions ecological farming. Roads are also often used for sports like Nordic walking in groups. The local camping ground can host about 200 and more people. Other economically uses include:

 timber and woodworking industry
 metal manufacturing
 farm machine dealing and repairing
 cargo company
 junkyarding
 information technologies

Notables 
 Ernst Buermeyer  (1883–1945) Educator, mayor of Gildehaus (Bad Bentheim), political party member of (DVP) and (NSDAP)

External links 

https://www.meesdorf.de - Informations about the village

Notes 

Melle, Germany
Osnabrück (district)